Dead Trees is the fifth studio album by post-hardcore band From First to Last, released April 23, 2015, via Sumerian Records. It is the first and only release to feature vocalist Spencer Sotelo (singer of progressive metal band Periphery), Taylor Larson as third guitarist, and new drummer, Ernie Slenkovich (original drummer Derek Bloom would return to the band in 2016).  Returning to the group is guitarist/vocalist and founder Travis Richter, who had left the band in 2009. The band planned for the release to be an EP but due to the success of their Kickstarter campaign, the band had enough money to fund this LP.

Track listing

Personnel
From First to Last
 Spencer Sotelo – lead vocals
 Matt Good – lead guitar, co-lead vocals, keyboards, programming
 Travis Richter – rhythm guitar, unclean vocals, background vocals
 Taylor Larson – co-lead guitar, co-rhythm guitar
 Matt Manning – bass guitar, background unclean vocals
 Ernie Slenkovich – drums, percussion

Production
Produced by Matt Good, Taylor Larson & Spencer Sotelo (The Triforce)
Engineered, Mixed & mastered by Taylor Larson
Pro Tools editing & additional tracking by Ernie Slenkovich
Artwork & layout by Unlimited Visual

References

2015 albums
From First to Last albums
Sumerian Records albums
Albums produced by Matt Good